David Dephoff (6 April 1928 – 14 November 2014) was a New Zealand long jumper and decathlete, who won the bronze medal in the men's long jump at the 1950 British Empire Games in Auckland.

National championships

At the 1949 national athletics championships, Dephoff won the inaugural decathlon title, with a total of 5446 points. He went on to defend his title in 1950 (5358 points) and 1951 (5919 points).

British Empire Games

Death
Dephoff died at Rotorua on 14 November 2014.

References

1928 births
2014 deaths
Sportspeople from Christchurch
New Zealand male long jumpers
New Zealand decathletes
Commonwealth Games bronze medallists for New Zealand
Athletes (track and field) at the 1950 British Empire Games
Commonwealth Games medallists in athletics
Medallists at the 1950 British Empire Games